Qasimabad Estate, (also known as Abdulpur Zamindari) was a Zamindari estate and a jagir, located in the Ghazipur district of Uttar Pradesh, India it got the status of jagir in year 1675. The capital of Qasimabad estate was the town of Qasimabad but later, in 1758 the capital was shifted to Bahadurganj.

History
It was ruled by the family of Abdulpur (Bahadurganj) who were the descendants of Nawab Sheikh Abdullah. Originally Qasim Khan was ruler of Zahurabad estate till his death in 1741 but lived in his kot at Daharwara . His son Nawab Sheikh Abdullah established Qasimabad after his name and build Qasimabad fort. In 1775, the Ghazipur sarakar became a part of in Banaras Estate. The Nawabs of Qasimabad also built some forts, namely Qasimabad Fort, Bahadurganj Fort, and Jalalabad fort. The First ruler was Sheikh Muhammad Qasim , Then Sheikh Abdullah, then his son Nawab Fazal Ali Khan, Nawab Azim Ali Khan(Fazal Ali's grandson) then the state was divided and the family establish them near the area of Bahadurganj, where two brother Named Nawab Abdul Khan and Nawab Bahadur Shah Khan establish their bazaar(Ganj) and zamindari and then their family continued the legacy , know Abdul Khan's family live in neighborhood names as Das ana or Abdulpur and his brother's family live in a area known as Chah ana in Bahadurganj.

References

Zamindari estates
History of Uttar Pradesh